East Sussex Constabulary was the territorial police force responsible for policing East Sussex in southern England from 1840 to 1968. Its headquarters were located at Malling House, Lewes, East Sussex.

History
East Sussex Constabulary were formed in 1840 and covered the area of East Sussex except for the boroughs of Brighton, Hove, Eastbourne and Hastings, which were served by their own borough police forces. During the Second World War these forces, together with West Sussex Constabulary, were temporarily amalgamated in 1943 to form the Sussex Police Force. After the war, the forces reverted in 1947 to their previous formation, except that Hove remained part of East Sussex Constabulary, whose headquarters were relocated to Malling House, Lewes in 1948. In addition there were divisional headquarters at East Grinstead, Lewes, Bexhill and Hove. 

During the post-war years a number of specialist units were created, including Criminal Investigation (CID), Drugs, Special Branch, Policewomen, Firearms, etc.  

On 1 January 1968 the East Sussex forces were re-amalgamated with those of West Sussex to form the Sussex Constabulary, renamed the Sussex Police in 1974.

Chief Constables
Chief Constables were: 
1840–1881: Lt-Colonel Henry Fowler Mackay
1881–1894 : Major George Bentinck Luxford 
1894–1920 : Major Hugh Lang
1920–1936 : Lt. Col George Ormerod, DSO
1936–1965 (except 1943–1947) : Reginald Breffit, OBE 
1966–1967 : George Walter Roberts Terry,  OBE
1968 : East Sussex merged with West Sussex, Brighton, Eastbourne and Hastings Constabularies to form Sussex Constabulary

References

Police
1840 establishments in England
Government agencies established in 1840
East Sussex
Defunct police forces of England